The GAA Hall of Fame is the hall of fame for Gaelic games in Ireland. The hall opened in the Cusack Stand, Croke Park, Dublin, on 11 February 2013, with 32 inaugural inductees.

Inductees

References

Hurling
Gaelic Athletic Association
Halls of fame in the Republic of Ireland